Josiah Kelsall (20 May 1892 – 24 April 1974) was an English professional footballer who played as a forward for Sunderland.

References

1892 births
1974 deaths
People from Maryport
English footballers
Association football forwards
Sunderland A.F.C. players
Houghton Rovers F.C. players
Spennymoor United F.C. players
English Football League players
Footballers from Cumbria